Elaine Scott may refer to:
Elaine P. Scott (born 1957), American engineer
Elaine Anderson Steinbeck, American actress and stage producer also known as Elaine Anderson Scott
Elaine Scott (producer), Canadian television producer of Starhunter and A Friend of the Family (film)
Elaine Scott (writer), 1999 Science Writing Award winner